Brahmanbaria-2 is a constituency represented in the Jatiya Sangsad (National Parliament) of Bangladesh since 2018 by Ukil Abdul Sattar Bhuiyan of the Bangladesh Nationalist Party.

Boundaries 
The constituency encompasses Ashuganj and Sarail upazilas.

History 
The constituency was created in 1984 from the Comilla-2 constituency when the former Comilla District was split into three districts: Brahmanbaria, Comilla, and Chandpur.

Ahead of the 2008 general election, the Election Commission redrew constituency boundaries to reflect population changes revealed by the 2001 Bangladesh census. The 2008 redistricting altered the boundaries of the constituency.

Ahead of the 2014 general election, the Election Commission reduced the boundaries of the constituency. Previously it had also included three union parishads of Brahmanbaria Sadar Upazila: Budhanti, Chandura, and Harashpur.

Members of Parliament

Elections

Elections in the 2010s

Elections in the 2000s

Elections in the 1990s

References

External links
 

Parliamentary constituencies in Bangladesh
Brahmanbaria District